The women's high jump at the 2013 World Championships in Athletics was held at the Luzhniki Stadium on 15–17 August.

It took 1.92 to make the final.  In the final, six competitors cleared 1.97, world leader and Olympic silver medalist Brigetta Barrett, Olympic gold medalist and defending champion Anna Chicherova, and European indoor champion Ruth Beitia still perfect.  But at 2.00, only Barrett and Olympic bronze medalist Svetlana Shkolina made it, both on the first attempt, giving Barrett the lead and leaving Chicherova and Beitia tied for bronze.  At 2.03, Shkolina reversed that position with a first attempt clearance.  Barrett had no answer.

The answer came in February 2019 when Shkolina was handed a four-year ban for doping, retroactive to 2012, disqualifying her gold medal.

Records
Prior to the competition, the records were as follows:

Schedule

Results

Qualification
Qualification: Qualifying Performance 1.95 (Q) or at least 12 best performers (q) advanced to the final.

Final

The final was started at 18:00.

References

External links
High jump results at IAAF website

High jump
High jump at the World Athletics Championships
2013 in women's athletics